The 1995 Men's African Volleyball Championship was held in Tunis, Tunisia, from October 13 to October 21 with six teams participating in the continental championship.

Teams

Results

Round-robin

Final ranking

References
 Men Volleyball Africa Championship 1995 Tunis (TUN)

1995 Men
African championship, Men
Men's African Volleyball Championship
1995 in Tunisian sport
International volleyball competitions hosted by Tunisia